Khuddar is a 1985 "Family Drama" Pakistani Punjabi language film.

Directed and produced by M. Akram. Film starring actor Sultan Rahi in the lead role and with Anjuman and Mustafa Qureshi and Talish as the Grandfather.

Cast
 Sultan Rahi
 Anjuman
 Mustafa Qureshi
 Iqbal Hassan - Jan Khan
 Zumurrud 
 Khanum - Jan khan (Sister)
 Zubair 
 Bahar
 Aslam Pervaiz
 Naghma - Sabra Iman
 Talish - Khan Shan
 Nasrullah Butt
 Ladla
 Changezi
 Munir Zarif
 Haq Nawaz

Super-hit film songs of Khuddar (1985)
Khuddar (1985) was a super-hit Punjabi musical film of 1985. Music by Wajahat Attre and film song lyrics by Khawaja Pervez.

References

External links
film Khuddar (1985) on IMDb website

Pakistani action drama films
1980s action drama films
Punjabi-language Pakistani films
1985 films
1980s Punjabi-language films
1985 drama films